

See also
List of PlayStation VR games

References

Games
4 games
 
Free-to-play video games